Middletown High School is a high school located in Middletown, Maryland, United States.  First established in 1888, the school opened in its current building in April 1974.

Student activities
MHS offers 162 sports teams in 125 sports, visual and performing arts, academic societies, agriculture and club organizations.  Many extracurricular clubs, including an Academic Team, Physics Club, Model UN, National Honors Society, Science National Honor Society, Mu Alpha Theta Math Honor Society, Tri-M Music Honors society, Future Business Leaders of America, Nu Delta Alpha Dance Honors Society, Mock Trial, Drama Club, TBA Improv Troupe, National English Honors Society, Rho Kappa National Social Studies Honor Society, Student Government Association (SGA), FFA, Gay-Straight Alliance, and Fellowship of Christian Athletes.

Music
The school's band are called the "Marching Knights" and since 2002 have been directed by Matthew Shearer. In 2006 the band placed 4th at the James Madison University Parade of Champions. They also received the award for best colorguard in their class. In the fall of 2014, the Marching Knights became US Bands Group IIIA MD State Champions at the State Championship at Towson University.

Athletics
The school's colors are orange and black, and athletic teams are known as the “Knights.”

Academic programs
In 2003 MHS implemented the county's first APEX (Advanced Placement Experience) program for a select group of Freshmen. Students in the program commit to taking a minimum of six AP courses in high school, beginning in the sophomore year.  Because of the school's emphasis on AP courses the number of students taking AP exams in the past two years has nearly doubled.  MHS was also the county's first high school to establish a Freshman Academy to maximize student achievement during the often-difficult transition from Middle to High School.  As of the 2006-2007 School Year, The Advisement Programme was terminated for reasons unknown to the general public at MHS.

Maryland Department of Education Commendation for Maryland School Assessment Performance, 2004
In 2005 received a $10,000 technology grant from Intel Corporation, awarded for internal teamwork

Notable alumni

 Rob Ambrose – American football coach for Towson Tigers
 Scott Devours – musician
 Jason Freeny – sculptor, artist
 Megan Gebbia (1990) – women's college basketball head coach with American and Wake Forest
 Matt Huseman – musician
 Charlie “King Kong” Keller – 5x Major League Baseball All-Star for New York Yankees and Detroit Tigers, 4x World Series champion
 Hal Keller – Major League Baseball player and former vice president/general manager for Seattle Mariners
 Rick Leonard – American football player for Florida State Seminoles and New Orleans Saints
 Matt K. Lewis – political writer and CNN commentator
 Amber Theoharis (1996) – co-host with the NFL Network show NFL Total Access

References

External links

Middletown Football
The Round Table
MHS Instrumental Music

Public high schools in Maryland
Educational institutions established in 1888
Schools in Frederick County, Maryland
1888 establishments in Maryland